Bezy's night lizard (Xantusia bezyi) is a species of lizard in the family Xantusiidae. The species is endemic to Arizona.

Etymology
Bezy's night lizard is named after noted American herpetologist Robert Lee Bezy (born 1941).

Geographic range
X. bezyi is found in central Arizona.

Description
Small, smooth-skinned, and gray-brown to yellow-brown, X. bezyi measures  from its nose to its vent. It has a flattened head, and dark splotches on its back. The eyes lack eyelids and have vertical, linear pupils.

Habitat
Desert highlands and pine woodlands are the preferred habitats of X. bezyi, where it is found under exfoliating rock in granite outcrops.

Diet
The diet of X. bezyi consists of spiders and insects.

Behavior
During daylight hours X. bezyi shelters in rock crevices.

Reproduction
X. bezyi is viviparous.

References

Further reading
Goldberg, Stephen R.; Bezy, Robert L. (2014). "Xantusia bezyi (Bezy's night lizard) reproduction". Herpetological Review 45 (3): 509.
Papenfuss, Theodore J., Macey, J. Robert; Schulte, James A. II (2001). "A New Lizard Species in the Genus Xantusia from Arizona". Scientific Papers, Natural History Museum, University of Kansas (23): 1–9. (Xantusia bezyi, new species).

External links

Bezy's night lizard
Reptiles of the United States
Fauna of the Sonoran Desert
Fauna of the Southwestern United States
Reptiles of Mexico
Reptiles described in 2001
Taxa named by Theodore Johnstone Papenfuss